"Hit Song" is a song by Custard, released as the second single from the band's fifth album, Loverama. It reached No. 60 on the Australian ARIA singles chart, and No. 83 on the 1999 Hottest 100.

Lyrics
McCormack said, "The record companies are always keen for that radio-friendly, unit-shifting smash hit. And that is their job I guess. So I basically quoted all the things I'd heard them say to us and other people. Like you have to have a hit song -- you need a chorus and the verse and then the other chorus and it just seemed like a formula. So I thought that if they want a hit song I will just write exactly what they want and I guess they thought I was being too cynical and ironic but I was just trying to give them what they wanted. I gave them exactly what they asked for. And they said 'Thank you very much'."

Track listing

Charts

References

Song recordings produced by Magoo (Australian producer)
1999 singles
Custard (band) songs
1999 songs